Nelson Cricket Club is a semi-professional cricket club based in the town of Nelson, Lancashire, England. The club plays in the Lancashire League, and has done so since its formation in 1892. The Lancashire League requires that each club plays one professional in each match. Traditionally, clubs in the league have hired a number of international and first-class players. Nelson's first professionals, for the 1892 season, were England Test player, Willis Cuttell and Derbyshire bowler, John Hulme. In 1900, the league rules were amended so that only one professional could be appointed per season. Since then, a number of famous players have represented the club, including Learie Constantine, Kapil Dev and Steve Waugh. Current Australia spin-bowler Nathan Hauritz played for the side in the 2005 season.

As of 2011, former West Indies batsman Keith Arthurton has the highest batting average of all the professionals, attaining an average of 113.66 in 10 matches in the 2000 campaign. Fellow West Indian, Learie Constantine, achieved the highest individual score to date of 192 not out against East Lancashire on 2 August 1937. Australian Joe Scuderi, who played over 120 games for the side in 12 seasons, holds both the professional and amateur records for the most runs in a single season. In 1991, he broke the professional record, amassing 1,414 runs in his first year with Nelson. He went on to surpass the amateur tally in 2005, scoring 1,135 runs. So far, the only professional bowlers to have taken all 10 wickets in an innings were Constantine, who conceded only 10 runs in the process against Accrington on 12 May 1934, and South African medium-pacer Anthonie Ferreira, who achieved the feat against the same club on 25 June 1988.

Professionals

Key
Players in bold have played for their country in at least one Test match, One Day International or Twenty20 International.

Batting:
M = Matches played
RS = Runs scored
HS = High score
* = Not out
BatA = Batting average

Bowling/Fielding:
O = Overs bowled
RC = Runs conceded
W = Wickets taken
BowlA = Bowling average
BF = Best figures
Ct = Catches

Footnotes

A. : The list of Nelson professionals says that King played for Nelson between 1974 and 1975, however CricketArchive shows that he played for the club in the 1976 season.
B. : Scuderi played for Nelson as professional from 1991–1996 and 2002–2003, but also played as an amateur in the 2004 and 2005 seasons as well as playing one match in both the 2006 and 2009 seasons.
C. : Devon Conway held South African citizenship during his time at Nelson; however, he later went on to represent New Zealand in international cricket.

References
General

Specific

Nelson Cricket Club
Sport in the Borough of Pendle
Nelson, Lancashire
Cricket